Pinaleus is a genus of flies in the family Stratiomyidae.

Species
Pinaleus bivittatus Bezzi, 1928
Pinaleus conformis Bezzi, 1928
Pinaleus rostrifer Bezzi, 1928

References

Stratiomyidae
Brachycera genera
Taxa named by Mario Bezzi
Diptera of Australasia